The Marree Mosque is a mosque located in , South Australia, Australia.

History 
These "Afghans" were generally Muslims from then-British India, although some came from Afghanistan and the Middle East. They worked as cameldrivers and breeders in the region. Figures indicate an approximation that 3,000 "Ghans" were involved in this type of work until it was overtaken by the car and train in the 1930s.

The mosque was constructed by camel breeder Abdul Kadir, owner of Wangamanna Station. Another cameleer, Mullah Assim Khan, became imam of the Marree mosque in the early 20th century. The town had two mosques for some time, before the northern one was abandoned around 1910. Another report indicates that a mosque was deliberately demolished in 1956 by its elderly caretaker, Syed Goolamdeen, who could no longer maintain it.

As of 2003, it was reported in one source that the descendants of the Afghans in Marree have rebuilt the mosque.  However, a heritage survey funded by the Australian and South Australian governments and which was conducted  from April 2001 to June 2002 reveals that the mosque no longer exists apart from an area of prepared ground and post stubs, and the nearby remains of an enclosure for camels.  The report of the heritage survey which was published in 2002 reports that a "replica mosque" had  been built within the Marree township.   A tourist map published in 2018 shows a mosque within a park called the "Afghan Camellier Park" (sic)  located within the alignment of the former Central Australia Railway which passed through the town.

See also

 List of mosques in Oceania
 Afghan cameleers in Australia
 List of first mosques by country

References

Further reading
Australia's First Muslims at ArdernObservations blogspot

Mosques in South Australia
Far North (South Australia)
Religious organizations established in 1882
1882 establishments in Australia
Former religious buildings and structures in Australia
Mosques completed in 1882